Pauline Knip née Pauline Rifer de Courcelles (26 July 1781 – 18 April 1851) was a French bird artist who was married to Joseph August Knip from 1808 until they divorced in 1824. Her paintings of birds, particularly the pigeons, were used in Coenraad Jacob Temminck's multi-part work Histoire Naturelle des Pigeons et des Gallinaces. She altered parts nine and later of this multipart work, retitling it to Les Pigeons by Madame Knip with Temminck only being author of the text. She however sent a copy to Temminck that was not tampered. She was the mother of Dutch artist Henriëtte Ronner-Knip.

She was born in Paris. Her father was a senior navy officer. She studied art under Jacques Barraband and exhibited her watercolours and pen illustrations at the 1808, 1810, 1812 and 1814 salons. She met Joseph Knip, a student of Van Spaendonck, at Barraband's studio.

The alterations to the title of the work have led to problems in taxonomy, how the authors are to be cited for species described in them and the dates of publication to be considered (especially when applying the principle of priority in the International Code of Zoological Nomenclature). When the work was being prepared, Temminck lived in Holland and de Courcelles lived in Paris and was relied upon to supervise the engraving and printing. Madame de Courcelles was a friend of Marie Louise, the wife of Napoleon Bonaparte, and had royal patronage. Temminck discovered the alterations only after 1812 and found that he could not complain about the piracy because of her powerful friends. He however added a note on the matter at the end of the third and last volume of his 1815 work Histoire naturelle générale des pigeons et des gallinacés.

References

1781 births
1851 deaths
19th-century French women artists
19th-century French painters
Painters from Paris
French bird artists